This is a list of articles listing power stations around the world by countries or regions. A power station (also referred to as a generating station, power plant, powerhouse or generating plant) is an industrial place for the generation of electric power.

Africa 
 List of power stations in Algeria
 List of power stations in Angola
 List of power stations in Benin
 List of power stations in Botswana
 List of power stations in Burkina Faso
 List of power stations in Burundi
 List of power stations in Cameroon
 List of power stations in Chad
 List of power stations in the Democratic Republic of the Congo
 List of power stations in Djibouti
 List of power stations in Egypt
 List of power stations in Equatorial Guinea
 List of power stations in Eritrea
 List of power stations in Eswatini
 List of power stations in Ethiopia
 List of power stations in Gabon
 List of power stations in Ghana
 List of power stations in Guinea
 List of power stations in Ivory Coast
 List of power stations in Kenya
 List of power stations in Liberia
 List of power stations in Libya
 List of power stations in Malawi
 List of power stations in Mauritania
 List of power stations in Mali
 List of power stations in Morocco
 List of power stations in Mozambique
 List of power stations in Namibia
 List of power stations in Niger
 List of power stations in Nigeria
 List of power stations in the Republic of the Congo
 List of power stations in Rwanda
 List of power stations in Senegal ⋅
 List of power stations in Sierra Leone
 List of power stations in Somalia
 List of power stations in South Africa
 List of power stations in South Sudan
 List of power stations in Sudan
 List of power stations in Tanzania
 List of power stations in Tunisia
 List of power stations in Togo
 List of power stations in Uganda
 List of power stations in Zambia
 List of power stations in Zimbabwe

Asia 

 List of power stations in Afghanistan
 List of power stations in Armenia
 List of power stations in Azerbaijan
 List of power stations in China
 List of major power stations in Anhui
 List of major power stations in Beijing
 List of major power stations in Chongqing
 List of major power stations in Fujian province
 List of major power stations in Gansu
 List of major power stations in Guangdong
 List of major power stations in Guangxi
 List of major power stations in Guizhou
 List of major power stations in Hainan province
 List of major power stations in Hebei province
 List of major power stations in Heilongjiang
 List of major power stations in Henan province
 List of power stations in Hong Kong
 List of major power stations in Hubei province
 List of major power stations in Hunan province
 List of major power stations in Inner Mongolia
 List of major power stations in Jiangsu province
 List of major power stations in Jiangxi province
 List of major power stations in Jilin province
 List of major power stations in Liaoning province
 List of power stations in Macau
 List of major power stations in Ningxia
 List of major power stations in Qinghai province
 List of major power stations in Shaanxi
 List of major power stations in Shandong
 List of major power stations in Shanghai
 List of major power stations in Shanxi
 List of major power stations in Sichuan
 List of major power stations in Tianjin
 List of major power stations in the Tibet Autonomous Region
 List of major power stations in Xinjiang
 List of major power stations in Yunnan
 List of major power stations in Zhejiang
 List of power stations in Georgia (country)
 List of power stations in India
 List of power stations in Indonesia
 List of power stations in Iran
 List of power stations in Iraq
 List of power stations in Israel
 List of power stations in Japan
 List of power stations in Kazakhstan
 List of power stations in Kyrgyzstan
 List of power stations in Malaysia
 List of power stations in Myanmar
 List of power stations in Nepal
 List of power plants in the Philippines
 List of power stations in Russia
 List of power stations in South Korea
 List of power stations in Sri Lanka
 List of power stations in Syria
 List of power stations in Taiwan
 List of power stations in Tajikistan
 List of power stations in Thailand
 List of power stations in Vietnam

Europe 
 List of power stations in Albania
 List of power stations in Armenia
 List of power stations in Austria
 List of power stations in Belgium
 List of power stations in Bosnia-Herzegovina
 List of power stations in Bulgaria
 List of power stations in Croatia
 List of power stations in the Czech Republic
 List of power stations in Denmark
 List of power stations in Finland
 List of power stations in France
 List of power stations in Germany
 List of power stations in Greece
 List of power stations in Hungary
 List of power stations in Iceland
 List of power stations in the Republic of Ireland
 List of power stations in Italy
 List of power stations in Latvia
 List of power stations in Lithuania
 List of power stations in Montenegro
 List of power stations in the Netherlands
 List of power stations in North Macedonia
 List of power stations in Norway
 List of power stations in Poland
 List of power stations in Portugal
 List of power stations in Romania
 List of power stations in Russia
 List of power stations in Serbia
 List of power stations in Slovakia
 List of power stations in Slovenia
 List of power stations in Spain
 List of power stations in Sweden
 List of power stations in Switzerland
 List of power stations in Turkey
 List of power stations in Ukraine
 Lists of power stations in the United Kingdom
 List of power stations in England
 List of power stations in Northern Ireland
 List of power stations in Scotland
 List of power stations in Wales
 List of power stations in the British Crown Dependencies

North America 
 List of electrical generating stations in Canada
 List of electrical generating stations in Alberta
 List of electrical generating stations in British Columbia
 List of electrical generating stations in Manitoba
 List of electrical generating stations in New Brunswick
 List of electrical generating stations in Newfoundland and Labrador
 List of electrical generating stations in the Northwest Territories
 List of electrical generating stations in Nova Scotia
 List of electrical generating stations in Nunavut
 List of electrical generating stations in Ontario
 List of electrical generating stations in Prince Edward Island
 List of electrical generating stations in Quebec
 List of electrical generating stations in Saskatchewan
 List of electrical generating stations in Yukon
 List of power stations in Costa Rica
 List of hydroelectric power stations in Guatemala
 List of power stations in Mexico
 List of power stations in Panama
 List of power stations in the United States
 List of power stations in Arizona
 List of power stations in California
 List of power stations in Florida
 List of power stations in Georgia
 List of power stations in Indiana
 List of power stations in Illinois
 List of power stations in Michigan
 List of power stations in Nevada
 List of power stations in New Jersey
 List of power stations in New Mexico
 List of power stations in New York
 List of power stations in Oregon
 List of power stations in Pennsylvania
 List of power stations in South Carolina
 List of power stations in South Dakota
 List of power stations in Texas
 List of power stations in Virginia
 List of power stations in Washington
 List of power stations in Wisconsin
 List of wind farms in the United States

Oceania 
 List of power stations in Australia
 List of power stations in New South Wales
 List of power stations in Queensland
 List of power stations in South Australia
 List of power stations in Tasmania
 List of power stations in Victoria
 List of power stations in Western Australia
 List of proposed power stations in Australia
 List of power stations in New Zealand

South America 
 List of power stations in Argentina
 List of power stations in Bolivia
 List of power stations in Brazil
 List of power stations in Chile
 List of power stations in Colombia
 List of power stations in Ecuador
 List of power stations in Suriname
 List of power stations in Paraguay
 List of power stations in Peru
 List of power stations in Uruguay
 List of power stations in Venezuela

See also 
 List of largest power stations in the world

References